The Y Sap mine was an underground explosive charge, secretly planted by the British during the First World War and ready for 1 July 1916, the first day on the Somme. The mine was named after Y Sap, the British trench from which the gallery was driven. It was one of 19 mines on the British sector to be blown at the start of the battle.

The explosion of the Y Sap mine failed to assist the British attack as the German eavesdroppers at the  28  listening station intercepted and passed on the British "good luck" message. The 34th Division had the highest number of casualties of any of the divisions involved on 1 July. The crater of the Y Sap mine was filled in after World War I and is no longer visible.

Background

1914

French and German military operations began on the Somme in September 1914. A German advance westwards towards Albert was stopped by the French at La Boisselle and attempts to resume mobile warfare in October failed. Both sides reduced their attacks to local operations or raids and began to fortify their remaining positions with underground works. On 18 December, the French captured the La Boisselle village cemetery at the west end of a German salient and established an advanced post only  from the German front line. On Christmas Day 1914, French engineers sank the first mine shaft at La Boisselle.

1915

On the night of  a German sapper inadvertently broke into French mine gallery, which he found to have been charged with explosives; a group of volunteers took 45 minutes to dismantle the charge and cut the firing cables.

At the end of July 1915, fresh troops were observed moving into the French positions north of the Somme and on 1 August, they were identified at Thiepval Wood as British soldiers ("dressed in brown suits"). The British had formed the 178th and 179th Tunnelling companies in August, followed by the 185th and 252nd Tunnelling companies in October. Brigadier-General George Fowke the Engineer-in-Chief of the BEF, moved the 174th and 183rd Tunnelling Companies into the area but at first the British did not have enough miners to take over the large number of French shafts; the problem was temporarily solved when the French agreed to leave their engineers behind for several weeks. On 24 July, the 174th Tunnelling Company established headquarters at Bray, taking over some 66 shafts at Carnoy, Fricourt, Maricourt and La Boisselle.

Elaborate precautions were taken to preserve secrecy, since no continuous front line trench ran through the area opposite the west end of La Boisselle and the British front line. The  site was defended by posts near the mine shafts. The right and left tunnels collapsed; it was later found that the German explosion had detonated the British mine.

Prelude

1916

At the start of the Battle of Albert (1–13 July), the name given by the British to the first two weeks of the Battle of the Somme, La Boisselle stood on the centre of the British attack. The tunnelling companies were to help the Allied preparations for the battle by placing 19 mines of various sizes under the German positions along the front line and by preparing a series of shallow Russian saps from the British front line into no man's land, which would be opened at Zero Hour to allow the infantry to attack the German positions from a much shorter distance. At La Boisselle, four mines were prepared by the Royal Engineers, two charges (No 2 straight and No 5 right) were planted at L'îlot at the end of galleries dug from Inch Street Trench by the 179th Tunnelling Company, intended to wreck German tunnels and create crater lips to block enfilade fire along no man's land. As the Germans in La Boisselle had fortified the cellars of ruined houses and the cratered ground made a direct infantry assault on the village impossible, two further mines, known as Y Sap, the British name for the German  strongpoint and Lochnagar after the trench from which the gallery was dug, were planted to the north-east and the south-east of La Boisselle to assist the attack on either side of the German salient in the village.

In January and February 1916, British raiding parties had discovered that the  strongpoint (Y Sap to the British) was protected by a system of deep mines. Y Sap mine was dug underneath the  strongpoint, which overlooked Mash Valley, just north of La Boisselle. The gallery was dug about  into no man's land, then doglegged to the right for about another . About  of ammonal was placed in the chamber under Y Sap (the ).

To keep quiet, the tunnellers used bayonets with spliced handles and worked barefoot on a floor covered with sandbags. Flints were carefully prised out of the chalk and laid on the floor; if the bayonet was manipulated two-handed, an assistant caught the dislodged material. Spoil was placed in sandbags, passed hand-to-hand along a row of miners sitting on the floor and stored along the side of the tunnel, later to be used to tamp the charge. Lochnagar and Y Sap mines were overcharged to ensure that large rims were formed from the disturbed ground and communication tunnels were also dug for use immediately after the first attack. The mines were laid without interference by German miners but while the ammonal was being placed, German troops of the 9th Company, RIR 110 could hear the British miners but not where they were; German miners could be heard by the British miners below Lochnagar and above Y Sap mine.

Hance's superiors agreed that firing Y Sap mine early could help to neutralise enemy fire from the flanks around La Boisselle but the explosion would alert the Germans that a British attack was imminent and the suggestion was rejected.

Battle

1 July

Y Sap and Lochnagar mines were the largest mines ever detonated. The blast was the largest man-made sound in history and some reports said that it could be heard from London. The explosion of Y Sap mine left a large crater but failed to assist the British attack at Zero Hour as the Germans had detected the mine in time, evacuated the position and caught the British infantry in crossfire, particularly the troops of the 102nd (Tyneside Scottish) Brigade (Brigadier-General T. P. B. Tiernan), on the left flank of the 34th Division. The brigade suffered the worst losses of any brigade on the first day on the Somme, many of the casualties occurring behind the British front-line. Losses in the brigade on 1 July were so severe that on 6 July, the brigade was swapped with a brigade of the 37th Division.

Analysis

The detonation of Y Sap and Lochnagar mines failed to neutralise the German defences in La Boisselle. The mines were expected to provide some protection against German machine-gun fire, by creating mounds around the crater rims and a smoke screen was to cover La Boisselle at zero hour but the wind blew it away from the village. Prior and Wilson criticised the bombardment plan for lifting the heavy artillery off the German front line at  thirty minutes before the infantry advance, which meant that its fire for the rest of the day was ineffective. Field artillery and field howitzers were left to suppress the German defenders for the last thirty minutes but had little destructive power against field fortifications. The German  apparatus eavesdroppers, who warned of the attack, enabled the Germans to vacate the underground shelters near Y Sap in time and shoot down the infantry of the fourth brigade column. La Boisselle was meant to fall within twenty minutes but it was captured by the British and re-captured by the Germans several times before it finally fell on 4 July, the divisions III Corps having suffered more than  the worst losses of the British divisions engaged on 1 July. The 19th Division was rushed forward in case of a German counter-attack on Albert.

Post-war

After the Armistice of 11 November 1918, the inhabitants of La Boisselle returned and rebuilt their houses. The Y Sap mine crater was filled in, landscaped and partly built over; it is no longer visible.

See also 

 List of the largest artificial non-nuclear explosions

Notes

Footnotes

Bibliography

Books
 
 
 
 
 
 
 
 
 
 
 

Websites

Further reading

External links 
 Aerial view of Ovillers-La-Boisselle; the crater of the Y Sap mine is visible near the centre
 Surface model of the Y Sap, Glory Hole and Lochnagar craters
 La Boisselle Study Group
 Ovillers-La-Boisselle photo essay
 Royal Engineers Museum and Library Corps History Part 14, The Corps and the First World War (1914–18)

Battle of the Somme
Tunnel warfare in World War I
World War I sites in France
Explosions in 1916
Conflicts in 1916
1916 in France
Battles of the Western Front (World War I)
Battles of World War I involving France
Battles of World War I involving Germany
Battles of World War I involving the United Kingdom
Monuments and memorials in Somme (department)
World War I memorials